Hopewell is an unincorporated community in Rutherford County, North Carolina, United States. It lies at an elevation of 1053 feet (321 m).

References

Unincorporated communities in Rutherford County, North Carolina
Unincorporated communities in North Carolina